220 Volt Live is the forty-eighth release and seventh live album by Tangerine Dream. It was recorded live in the USA in 1992. It would be the last live album to feature new compositions until Inferno (2002). This may be considered some of the band's most rock oriented music so far, with guitarist Zlatko Perica's playing being a more prominent element. Re-issued in 1999 and then again in 2009 on Membran. It was nominated for Best New Age Album at the 1994 Grammy Awards.

Track listing

Personnel
 Tangerine Dream
 Edgar Froese – keyboards, guitar
 Jerome Froese – keyboards, guitar
 Linda Spa – saxophone, keyboards
 Zlatko Perica – guitar

Single

Dreamtime was released alongside 220 Volt Live in 1993. It contains three shortened tracks from the album, plus the studio track Treasure of Innocence which is a non-album version of their cover of "Purple Haze", and an alternate version of Dreamtime. This alternate version had lyrics written and performed by Jayney Klimek and Julie Ocean contributed to the lyric writing process.

Track listing

References

1993 live albums
Tangerine Dream live albums